Alfonso Martínez (24 January 1937 – 16 April 2011) was a Spanish basketball player. He competed in the men's tournament at the 1960 Summer Olympics and the 1968 Summer Olympics.

References

External links
 

1937 births
2011 deaths
Spanish men's basketball players
Olympic basketball players of Spain
Basketball players at the 1960 Summer Olympics
Basketball players at the 1968 Summer Olympics
CB Breogán players
Sportspeople from Zaragoza